Jesús Rodríguez Tato (born 12 July 1983) is a Spanish former footballer who played as a striker, currently assistant manager of China League One club Sichuan Jiuniu.

He spent most of his career in Segunda División, totalling 191 games and 35 goals in total of seven teams across nine seasons. He also competed professionally in Morocco and India.

Club career

Murcia
Born in Murcia, Tato began his development at Real Murcia and concluded it at FC Barcelona, where he made his senior debut for the reserves in Tercera División. In 2004, he returned to his hometown team in La Liga and made his professional debut on 28 March in a 2–0 home win against RCD Mallorca, coming on as a 74th-minute substitute for Juanma; he made six further appearances off the bench, as the season ended with relegation.

Tato scored his first professional goal on 6 May 2006, a consolation in a 2–1 away loss to CD Castellón in the Segunda División. He followed it eight days later with a brace in a 3–1 victory over CD Numancia at the Estadio de La Condomina, also providing an assist for Nacho Garro.

Halfway through Murcia's promotion-winning season, Tato returned to Catalonia by joining Segunda División B team UE Lleida on loan. The following campaign, he remained in the same level at AD Ceuta, helping them to the play-offs.

Journeyman
In 2008, Tato signed with neighbours FC Cartagena, and renewed his link after winning promotion to division two via the play-offs in his first season. After a second campaign at the Estadio Cartagonova he moved to Albacete Balompié, where he netted a career-best 13 goals in his only season, which ended in relegation from the second tier.

Tato joined Xerez CD in June 2011, being officially presented on 8 July and hoping to help them gain promotion to the top flight, but he left in January 2013 for fellow second division side UD Las Palmas for the same reason. He extended his contract at the latter club in the summer, after helping it to the play-offs.

In February 2014, Tato signed for Girona FC for the remainder of the season, and remained a free agent from then until September, when he joined Real Zaragoza still in the second tier.

In July 2015, Tato moved abroad for the first time in his career at the age of 32, joining Morocco's Moghreb Tétouan alongside compatriot José Manuel Rueda. He switched to a third continent in September 2016, signing for FC Pune City ahead of the Indian Super League season. He played all but four games for the latter, who missed out on the play-offs, and headed the opening goal of a 1–1 draw at Delhi Dynamos FC on 27 October.

After retiring, Tato worked as assistant manager under his compatriot Sergio Lobera at FC Goa. On 31 January 2020, the pair left the Fatorda Stadium, resuming their association at Mumbai City FC also of the Indian Super League and China League One side Sichuan Jiuniu FC.

References

External links

1983 births
Living people
Spanish footballers
Footballers from Murcia
Association football forwards
La Liga players
Segunda División players
Segunda División B players
Tercera División players
FC Barcelona C players
Real Murcia players
UE Lleida players
AD Ceuta footballers
FC Cartagena footballers
Albacete Balompié players
Xerez CD footballers
UD Las Palmas players
Girona FC players
Real Zaragoza players
La Roda CF players
Botola players
Moghreb Tétouan players
Indian Super League players
FC Pune City players
Gibraltar Premier Division players
Lincoln Red Imps F.C. players
Spain youth international footballers
Spanish expatriate footballers
Expatriate footballers in Morocco
Expatriate footballers in India
Expatriate footballers in Gibraltar
Spanish expatriate sportspeople in Morocco
Spanish expatriate sportspeople in India
Spanish expatriate sportspeople in Gibraltar
Spanish expatriate sportspeople in China